Arnold Daghani (22 February 1909 in Suceava, Austria-Hungary – 6 April 1985 in Hove, United Kingdom) was a Romanian-born Jewish artist and writer and Holocaust survivor. Camp inmates worked on constructing Durchgangsstrasse IV, a major military road. While there Daghani chronicled his experiences in a diary and artwork which he managed to smuggle with himself when he escaped to Budapest in 1943. In 1947 he published these, first in Romanian, Groapa este în livada de visini, later translated into English under the title The Grave is in the Cherry Orchard appearing in ADAM International Review. After the war, he lived in Israel, France, Switzerland, and England.

Many of Arnold Daghani's works are held in The Arnold Daghani Collection at the University of Sussex, UK.

References

Bibliography
Bohm-Duchen, Monica. Daghani. London: Diptych, 1987. .
Daghani, Arnold. Arnold Daghani's Memories of Mikhailowka: The Illustrated Diary of a Slave Labour Camp Survivor. London: Vallentine Mitchell, 2009. .
Daghani, Arnold (1961). The Grave is in the Cherry Orchard. ADAM International Review.  No. 291-293.
Schultz, Deborah. Pictorial Narrative in the Nazi Period: Felix Nussbaum, Charlotte Salomon and Arnold Daghani. London: Routledge, 2009. .
University of Sussex: Centre for German-Jewish Studies. "The Arnold Daghani Collection". http://www.sussex.ac.uk. 2006. Retrieved 2012-3-13.

See also
 List of Holocaust diarists
 List of diarists
 List of posthumous publications of Holocaust victims

External links
The Arnold Daghani Collection

1909 births
1985 deaths
Romanian Jews
Jewish concentration camp survivors
People from Suceava
Holocaust diarists
Jewish artists
Jewish Romanian writers
20th-century Romanian male artists
Romanian emigrants to the United Kingdom